Jeseritz is a village and a former municipality in the district Altmarkkreis Salzwedel, in Saxony-Anhalt, Germany. Since 1 January 2010, it is part of the town Gardelegen.

Former municipalities in Saxony-Anhalt
Gardelegen